Neck of the Woods is the third studio album by Los Angeles alternative rock band Silversun Pickups. The album was produced by Jacknife Lee (R.E.M., Bloc Party) and was released on May 8, 2012, through independent label Dangerbird Records. Lead single "Bloody Mary (Nerve Endings)" was released via the band's official YouTube channel on March 25. On May 2, 2012 MTV Buzzworthy posted a full stream of the album online.

Reception

Reception for Neck of the Woods was generally positive. Review aggregating website Metacritic, which calculates an average score based on critical reviews, reports that the album scored 69 out of a possible 100, indicating "generally favorable reviews." Matt Collar of Allmusic awarded the album four out of five stars and stated, "building upon Swoons layered melodicism and once again showcasing lead singer/songwriter Brian Aubert's knack for evocative, introspective lyrics and fiery, multi-dubbed guitar parts, Neck of the Woods is an even more infectious and nuanced affair." Alternative Press journalist Scott Heisel also awarded the album four out of five stars. He expressed that "On Neck of the Woods, Silversun Pickups aren't reliving the ghosts of alt-rock past. Instead, they're helping define the genre's future." He added that the album felt "complete-and essential".

Other reviews were less positive. Pitchfork Media only award the album a 4.8 out of 10, concluding that "Appropriately enough, many of Aubert's lyrics here bristle with restlessness, fatigue and disappointment-- "I'm still waiting," "I'm already bored," "What am I aiming towards/ A fight that never ends," "Nothing's coming"—all of which serve to make Neck of the Woods a concept album about the feeling you get listening to Neck of the Woods".

Track listing

Chart positions

Personnel
All songs written and composed by Silversun Pickups.
 Brian Aubert - Main Vocals / Guitar 
 Nikki Monninger - Bass Guitar / Backing Vocals 
 Joe Lester - Keyboards / Sound Manipulation 
 Christopher Guanlao - Drums

Additional personnel
 Jacknife Lee - Keyboards, Mixing, Producer, Programming
 Lawrence Azerrad - Graphic Design
 Sam Bell - Engineer, Mixing
 Matt Bishop - Assistant Engineer, Editing
 Jeff Castelaz - A&R
 John Davis - Mastering
 Todd Hido - Photography

References

2012 albums
Silversun Pickups albums
Albums produced by Jacknife Lee